C4DI (the Centre for Digital Innovation in Hull) is a digital hub located at the Fruit Market in Kingston upon Hull, England. The company provides services to startups and has formed links with PwC, Amazon Web Services,  Kingston Communications and numerous other supporters to assist with this aim.  They launched the C4DI Accelerator in May 2014, which is expected to start in March 2015. The company has received visits from Chief Secretary to the Treasury Danny Alexander, Minister for Culture, Communications and Creative Industries Ed Vaizey and Shadow Minister for Culture and Media Helen Goodman on account of Hull being the 2017 UK City of Culture.

Company connections

KC Business 

Kingston Communications held an important role in providing the company with "...around 10 times faster downstream and 100 times faster for uploads than the typical standard UK broadband connection."

Spencer Group 
In October 2013, the Spencer Group was classified as the 'first Innovation Partner' of C4DI. The partnership was made to "...develop business opportunities which have a technological aspect and harness technology to drive forward the company's performance."

Ebuyer 
In March 2014, Ebuyer announced a formal partnership between the two companies with the aim; "...to encourage the formation and growth of tech start-ups in the area and offer opportunities to place innovative creations on the Ebuyer website." The announcement was considered a positive step in promoting Yorkshire ahead in the technology community and being able to compete with locations such as London and Manchester.

PwC 
In May 2014, PwC declared on its website that it would be supporting the C4DI accelerator which is designed, "...to fast-track high growth start-ups through smart investment capital by supporting and developing robust and globally-connected businesses."

Other 

The company has also formed links with Handelsbanken, Campaign Monitor, Twilio, Amazon Web Services, FreeAgent, Zapier, dotforge accelerator, Stelrad Group, SOFTIQ, Jelf Insurance Brokers, IT@Spectrum, University of Hull and Hull College.

Future development 
They previously operated from 'The C4DI Beta', a temporary location within the Wykeland offices adjacent to the current site, prior to moving into a new £13.4 million development on the bank of the Humber, part of the @Dock development, in December 2016.

References

Business incubators of the United Kingdom
Buildings and structures in Kingston upon Hull